Ruby Jean Dandridge (née Butler; March 3, 1900 – October 17, 1987) was an American actress from the early 1900s through to the late 1950s. Dandridge is best known for her role on the radio show Amos 'n Andy, in which she played Sadie Blake and Harriet Crawford, and on radio's Judy Canova Show, in which she played Geranium. She is recognized for her role in the 1959 movie A Hole in the Head as Sally.

Early life
Born Ruby Jean Butler in Wichita, Kansas, on March 3, 1900, she was one of four children. Dandridge's parents were Nellie Simon, a maid, and George Butler, who was a janitor, grocer and entertainer. Dandridge's father was also "a famous minstrel man."

Career
In 1937, Dandridge played one of the witches in what an article in The Pittsburgh Courier called a "sepia representation" of Macbeth in Los Angeles. California. The production began on July 8 at the Mayan Theater. Five years later, she appeared in a production of Hit the Deck at the Curran Theatre in San Francisco, California. One of Dandridge's earliest appearances (uncredited, as were many of the minor roles she played) was as a native dancer in King Kong (1933). In other films, she played Rheba, a maid, in Junior Miss (1945), Dabby in Tap Roots (1948), the housekeeper in Three Little Girls in Blue (1946), Mrs. Kelso in Cabin in the Sky (1943) and Violet in Tish (1942).  Dandridge played Oriole on both radio and TV versions of The Beulah Show, and Geranium in The Judy Canova Show, and was a regular cast member on Tonight at Hoagy's. She is heard as Raindrop on Gene Autry's Melody Ranch (August 1949 - April 1951). For one season (1961-1962), Dandridge played the maid on the television version of Father Knows Best.

Other business
In 1955, Dandridge and her business partner Dorothy Foster bought land in Twentynine Palms, California, with plans to construct a subdivision of 250 homes. Also in the 1950s, Dandridge formed a nightclub act that played in clubs around Los Angeles. A review of her act cited her "flashes of effervescent showmanship" and stated "What Ruby lacks in her voice, she invariably makes up for it with her winsome personality."

Personal life, death and legacy
On September 30, 1919, she married Cyril Dandridge. Dandridge moved with her husband to Cleveland, Ohio, where her daughter, actress Vivian Dandridge (1921–1991) was born. Her second daughter, Academy Award-nominated actress Dorothy Dandridge, was born there in 1922, five months after Ruby and Cyril divorced. It is noted that after her divorce, Dandridge became involved with her companion Geneva Williams, who reportedly overworked the children and punished them harshly. Dandridge attended her daughter Dorothy's funeral in 1965.

On October 17, 1987, Dandridge died of a heart attack at a nursing home in Los Angeles, California. She was interred next to Dorothy at Forest Lawn Memorial Park Cemetery in Glendale, California. In the 1999 film Introducing Dorothy Dandridge, Ruby is portrayed by Loretta Devine.

Filmography

Features
King Kong (1933) - Native Dancer (uncredited)
Black Moon (1934) - Black House Servant (uncredited)
Midnight Shadow (1939) - Mrs. Lingley
The Night Before the Divorce (1942) - One of Roselle's Fans (uncredited)
Gallant Lady (1942) - Sarah
Tish (1942) - Violet (uncredited)
The War Against Mrs. Hadley (1942) - Maid (uncredited)
Broken Strings (1942) - Dancer (uncredited)
A Night for Crime (1943) - Alice Jones - Cook (uncredited)
Cabin in the Sky (1943) - Mrs. Kelso
Corregidor (1943) - Hyacinth
Melody Parade (1943) - Ruby
I Dood It (1943) - Mammy, in the Show (uncredited)
Never a Dull Moment (1943) - Daisy (uncredited)
Hat Check Honey (1944) - Ophelia (uncredited)
Ladies of Washington (1944) - Nellie (uncredited)
Carolina Blues (1944) - Josephine (uncredited)
Can't Help Singing (1944) - Henrietta (uncredited)
The Clock (1945) - Milk Customer (uncredited)
Junior Miss (1945) - Rheba
Saratoga Trunk (1945) - Turbaned Vendor (uncredited)
Inside Job (1946) - Ivory (uncredited)
Three Little Girls in Blue (1946) - Mammy (uncredited)
Home in Oklahoma (1946) - Devoria
Dead Reckoning (1947) - Hyacinth
The Arnelo Affair (1947) - Maybelle - Parkson's Maid
My Wild Irish Rose (1947) - Della
Tap Roots (1948) - Dabby
Father Is a Bachelor (1950) - Lily (uncredited)
A Hole in the Head (1959) - Sally

Short subjects
Flop Goes the Weasel (1943) - Mammy Hen (voice, uncredited)
Screen Snapshots: The Judy Canova Show (1946) - Geranium, Radio Show Character
Silly Billie (1948) - Maid

Television
The Beulah Show (1952–1953) - Oriole
The Amos 'n' Andy Show (1951-1953) - supporting roles in at least four different episodes

References

External links

 
 
  Ruby Dandridge gravestone indicating 1900 as year of birth

African-American actresses
American film actresses
American radio actresses
American television actresses
1900 births
1987 deaths
LGBT actresses
LGBT African Americans
LGBT people from Kansas
Actresses from Kansas
Burials at Forest Lawn Memorial Park (Glendale)
Actors from Wichita, Kansas
20th-century African-American people
20th-century American actresses
20th-century African-American women
20th-century American LGBT people